The Beyers Lakes are located in the Tahoe National Forest, in California.

They can be accessed via the Beyers Lakes Trail from Grouse Ridge Trail.  Grouse Ridge trail can be accessed from the Eagle Lakes trailhead, off of Interstate 80, or from Grouse Ridge Campground.

They sit below the Black Buttes of Grouse Ridge, and are part of the Fordyce Creek watershed draining into Lake Spaulding.

See also
List of lakes in California

References

Lakes of the Sierra Nevada (United States)
Lakes of Nevada County, California
Tahoe National Forest
Lakes of California
Lakes of Northern California